The 11th Beijing International Film Festival was held in Beijing, China. Hosted by the Beijing Municipal Government and the China Media Group, the festival opened on September 21 with the Chinese 2021 film The Battle at Lake Changjin by Chen Kaige, Tsui Hark and Dante Lam. The festival was originally scheduled to be held from August 14 to 21, but was postponed due to the spread of Corona 19 delta mutation in China. 

The festival was held in hybrid format due to COVID-19 pandemic restrictions and around 300 films were screened. The online films are available for streaming on a cloud created by iQiyi. In 11th edition of festival, in 'Retrospect Section' the focus was on comic actor Charlie Chaplin.

The festival was closed on September 29 with the screening of 2019 film Saturday Fiction by Lou Ye. Beyond The Skies a Chinese film by Liu Zhihai won the Tiantan Award for best feature film.

International jury

Tiantan Awards
Seven members jury was selected for deciding the awards.

 Gong Li, Singaporean actress, chairman of the international jury, 
 Nadine Labaki, Lebanese actress, director and activist
 Renny Harlin, Finnish film director, producer and screenwriter
 Chen Kun, Chinese actor and singer
 Zhang Songwen, Chinese actor
 Leste Chen, Taiwanese director
 Wuershan, Chinese director

Forward Future
 Tony Rayns, President of Jury, British writer, commentator, film festival programmer and screenwriter,
 Yannis Sakaridis, Greek director and screenwriter
 Huang Lu, Chinese actress, director, screenwriter and producer, 
 Shuang XueTao, Chinese novelist, 
 Shen Yang, Chinese producer and curator

Panorama

Opening and closing films
 The Battle at Lake Changjin (China), dir: Chen Kaige, Tsui Hark, Dante Lam
 Saturday Fiction (China), dir: Lou Ye

Tiantan Awards Official Competition
These are the highest awards at the festival. 15 films have been shortlisted for the awards.

Highlighted title  indicates Tiantan award winner

All About My Mother (China), dir: Zhao Tianyu
Any Day Now (Finland), dir: Hamy Ramezan
A Morning of Farewell (Japan), dir: Izuru Narushima
A School in Cerro Hueso (Argentina), dir: Betania Cappato
A Siege Diary (Russia), dir: Andrey Zaytsev
Before Next Spring (China), dir: Li Gen
 • Beyond The Skies (China), dir: Liu Zhihai
Caged Birds (Switzerland, Germany), dir: Oliver Rihs
Conference (Russia, Estonia, UK, Italy), dir: Ivan I. Tversdovskiy
Last Film Show (India, France), dir: Pan Nalin
Moon Rock for Monday (Australia), dir: Kurt Martin
Night of the Kings (France, Ivory Coast, Canada, Senegal), dir: Philippe Lacôte
No Rest for the Old Lady (Romania), dir: Andrei Gruzsniczki
Slalom (France, Belgium), dir: Charlene Favier
The Pact (Denmark), dir: Bille August

Forward Future 

The Pack - 2020 (The Czech Republic), dir: Tomáš Polenský
 Bone Cage - 2020 (Canada), dir: Taylor Olson 
Namo - 2020 (Iran), dir: Nader Saeivar
Silenced Tree - 2020 (Iran/Turkey), dir: Faysal Soysal
 The Pit - 2020 (Latvia/ Finland), dir: Dace Pūce
 Knock Knock - 2020 (China), dir: Liu Xiang
 The Whaler Boy - 2020 (Russia/ Poland/ Belgium), dir: Philipp Yuryev
 Chupacabra - 2020 (Russia), dir: Grigory Kolomytsev

BJIFF Special: Retrospective of Gong Li 
Leap - 2020 (China), dir: Peter Chan
Shanghai - 2010 (USA), dir: Mikael Håfström
What Women Want - 2011 (China), dir: Chen Daming
The Monkey King 2 - 2016 (Mainland China/ Hong Kong), dir: Cheang Pou-soi
Shanghai Triad - 1995 (China), dir: Zhang Yimou
Flirting Scholar - 1993 (Hong Kong), dir: Lee Lik-chi
The Dragon Chronicles – The Maidens - 1994 (Hong Kong / Mainland China), dir: Andy Wing-Keung Chin
The Story of Qiu Ju - 1992 (China), dir: Zhang Yimou
Red Sorghum - 1987 (China), dir: Zhang Yimou

Premiere 
Three Floors Up - 2021 (Italy), dir: Nanni Moretti
Satoshi Kon: Dreaming Machine - 2021 (Japan), dir: Pascal-Alex Vincent
The Employer and the Employee - 2021 (Uruguay/ Argentina/ Brazil/ France), dir: Manolo Nieto
It's a Flickering Life - 2021 (Japan), dir: Yoji Yamada

Restored Classics
This section will screen immortal masterpieces.

 Ace in the Hole - 1951 (USA) dir: Billy Wilder
 An Autumn's Tale - 1987, (Hong Kong) dir: Mabel Cheung
 The Godfather Part III - 1990, (USA) dir: Francis Ford Coppola
 The Mirror - 1975 (Soviet Union) dir: Andrei Tarkovsky
 Rouge - 1988, (Hong Kong) dir: Stanley Kwan

Retrospect
In 11th edition of festival this section will showcase Charlie Chaplin's classic films.

 Limelight - 1952
The Great Dictator - 1940
 Monsieur Verdoux - 1947
City Lights - 1931
Modern Times - 1936
 The Circus - 1928
The Kid - 1921
The Gold Rush - 1925

Filmmaker in focus
 One Future - 2009 (Malaysia) dir: Chui Mui Tan
 Barbarian Invasion - 2021 (Malaysia) dir: Chui Mui Tan
 South of South - 2005 (Malaysia) dir: Chui Mui Tan
 Year without a Summer - 2010 (Malaysia) dir: Chui Mui Tan
 Company of Mushrooms - 2006 (Malaysia) dir: Chui Mui Tan
 The Beautiful Loser - 2015 (Malaysia) dir: Chui Mui Tan

Tribute
 Diabolique - 1955 (France) dir: Henri-Georges Clouzot
 The Wages of Fear - 1953 (Italy, France) dir: Henri-Georges Clouzot
 Spring, Summer, Fall, Winter... and Spring - 2003 (South Korea) dir: Kim Ki-duk

Women's voice
 A Balance - 2020 (Japan) dir: Yujiro Harumoto
 Hard Love - 2021 (China) dir: Dong Xueying
 Tomorrow's Dinner Table - 2021 (Japan) dir: Takahisa Zeze

Reality Rocks
 Mr. Bachmann and His Class - 2021 (Germany) dir: Maria Speth
 Epicentro - 2020 (Austria, France) dir: Hubert Sauper
 Acasă, My Home - 2020 (Romania) dir: Radu Ciorniciuc
 Stanislavski. Lust for Life - 2021 (Russia) dir: Julia Bobkova

Vision
Source:

 A Balance - 2020 (Japan) dir: Yujiro Harumoto
 Apples - 2020 (Greece, Poland) dir: Christos Nikou
 Digger - 2020 (Greece, France) dir: Georgis Grigorakis
 Hold Me Back - 2020 (Japan) dir: Akiko Ohku
 Introduction - 2021 (South Korea) dir: Hong Sang-soo
 Man from Podolsk - 2020 (Russia) dir: Semyon Serzin
 Masha - 2020 (Russia) dir: Anastasiya Palchikova
 Moon, 66 Questions - 2020 (Greece, France) dir: Jacqueline Lentzou
 The North Wind - 2021 (Russia) dir: Renata Litvinova
 Sputnik - 2020 (Russia) dir: Egor Abramenko
 Tailor - 2020 (Greece, Germany, Belgium) dir: Sonia Liza Kenterman

Dolby cinema section
 Akira - 1988 (Japan), dir: Katsuhiro Otomo
 It - 2017 (USA), dir: Andrés Muschietti
 Venom - 2018 (USA), dir: Ruben Fleischer
 In the Heights - 2021 (USA), dir: Jon M. Chu

Winners of Tiantan Awards

References

External links
 

Beijing International Film Festival
Beijing International Film Festival
Beijing
Beijing
2020s in Beijing